Shankar Vaman Dandekar (1895–1968), also known as Sonopant Dandekar, was a philosopher and educationist from Maharashtra, India. 

Dandekar was an important interpreter of Warkari Bhakti Sampraday in Maharashtra. He served as a professor of philosophy and the principal of Sir Parashurambhau College in Pune for many years. 

He edited and published several Hindu religious texts in Sanskrit and Marathi languages.

References

20th-century Indian philosophers
20th-century Indian educational theorists
1896 births
1969 deaths